Longay is a small uninhabited Scottish island in the Inner Sound just off the coast of the Isle of Skye, north of Pabay and east of Scalpay.

In 1971, the Caledonian MacBrayne mailboat Loch Seaforth ran aground on the island, sustaining only minimal damage.

References

Uninhabited islands of Highland (council area)